TV K3 or Televizija Kanal 3 is commercial television channel based in Prnjavor, Bosnia and Herzegovina. K3 TV broadcasts 24 hours of program daily, including more than 5 hours of its own production in the 10 TV shows that are created according to the wishes and interests of viewers in Republika Srpska. The program is mainly produced in Serbian.

TV K3 is also part of is part of Mreža TV. With a syndicated broadcasting programme under the Mreža TV label, TV stations have managed to cover 95 percent of the territory of Bosnia and Herzegovina. "Mreža TV" airs TV series, telenovels, movies and entertainment shows.

References

External links 
 www.tvk3.info
 Communications Regulatory Agency of Bosnia and Herzegovina

Television stations in Bosnia and Herzegovina
Television channels and stations established in 1995